was Japanese singer Shiina Ringo's first single as a solo artist in five years. It was released on May 27, 2009, the same day her debut single was released eleven years earlier.
The distributor is EMI Music Japan / Virgin Music.

Outline 
The single was her first in two and a half years as Shiina Ringo, and her first single in five years as a solo artist. 
"Ariamaru Tomi" is the theme song for the TV drama Smile of TBS. Shiina wrote this song at the request of the drama director. It was the first time that she had performed for a TV drama as a solo singer.

"Ariamaru Tomi" is not contained in Shiina's 4th studio album Sanmon Gossip released on June 24, 2009. However, "SG～Superficial Gossip～" is contained in the vinyl record Saturday Night Gossip (released on August 26, 2009) and "Ariamaru Tomi" was eventually released in her album Hi Izuru Tokoro (released November 5, 2014).

The song was performed live by Shiina as a part of her band Tokyo Jihen at their appearance at the Countdown Japan festival in 2009, and during the band's Ultra C tour in 2010.

Track listing

Chart rankings

Sales and certifications

Personnel

Personnel details were sourced from "Ariamaru Tomi"'s liner notes booklet.

Performers and musicians

Kenta Arai – bass guitar (#1)
Tomotaka Imamichi – guitars (#1)
Naoto Strings – strings (#2)
Noriyasu "Kāsuke" Kawamura – drums (#1)
Ryota Nozaki (Jazztronik) – all other instruments (#2)
Shiina Ringo – vocals
Suginami Junior Chorus – chorus (#1)

Technical and production

Ryota Nozaki (Jazztronik) – string arrangement (#2)
Shiina Ringo – arrangement, songwriting

References 

2009 singles
2009 songs
Japanese television drama theme songs
Songs written by Ringo Sheena
Ringo Sheena songs
Music videos directed by Yuichi Kodama